The Ikarus 55 is a high-floor coach designated for long-distance as well as interurban traffic, and the first rear-engine Ikarus bus. It was made from 1952 – 1973, alongside the technically related Ikarus 66, by the Hungarian bus maker Ikarus. In total, 8,350 Ikarus 55 and 66 were delivered to East-Germany.

Technical description 

Designed as a high-floor two-axle bus, the Ikarus 55 has a semi-self supporting body, with the engine installed behind the rear seats at the back. Both front and rear axles are leaf-sprung beam axles, with the rear axle being a live planetary axle. Only the front axle has hydraulic shock absorbers. Twin tyres are fitted on the rear axle, whilst single tyres are fitted on the front axle. The steering system is fully mechanical and not power assisted. A pneumatic braking system is installed, all four wheels have drum brakes. The parking brake is foot-operated.

The Ikarus 55 is powered by a water-cooled, naturally aspirated,  Csepel D-614 swirl chamber injected straight-six Diesel engine. This engine is a modified Steyr WD 613 engine with an enlarged cylinder bore, that was built under licence by Csepel. The torque is transmitted to a partial synchromesh five-speed gearbox via a single-disc dry clutch. The engine's best fuel consumption is rated approximately 190 g·PS−1·h−1 (258 g·kW−1·h−1)

Bibliography

References

External links 

Ikarus buses
Coaches (bus)
Step-entrance buses
Vehicles introduced in 1952